Cary, North Carolina, held an election for mayor on Tuesday, October 6, 2015. Harold Weinbrecht, the incumbent mayor, ran unopposed and won reelection to a third term.

Candidates
Harold Weinbrecht, Mayor of Cary since 2007

Results

References

Cary
Cary
Cary